John Lazarus may refer to:

 John Lazarus (missionary) (1845–1925), Christian missionary to India who rendered the Tirukkuṛaḷ into English in 1885
 John Lazarus (playwright) (born 1947), Canadian playwright